Monsieur Chouchani (January 9, 1895 – January 26, 1968), or "Shushani," is the nickname of an otherwise anonymous and enigmatic Jewish teacher with students in the land of Israel, South America, post-World War II Europe, and elsewhere, including Emmanuel Levinas and Elie Wiesel.

Biography
Not much is known about "Chouchani," including his real name, a secret which he zealously guarded. His origins are completely unknown, and his gravestone (located in La Paz, Canelones, Uruguay, where he died in January 1968) reads, "The wise Rabbi Chouchani of blessed memory. His birth and his life are sealed in enigma." The text is by Elie Wiesel who paid for this gravestone. The name "Shushani," which means "person from Shushan," is most probably an allegorical reference, or possibly a pun. Elie Wiesel hypothesizes that Chouchani's real name was Mordechai Rosenbaum, while Hebrew University professor Shalom Rosenberg asserts that Chouchani's actual name was Hillel Perlman.
An article published by Yael Levine in 2015, based on genealogical research, brought documentation supporting the view that Chouchani was none other than Perlman, a native of Brest-Litovsk (Brisk).

Although there is no known body of works by Chouchani himself, there is a very strong intellectual legacy seen in the influence on his pupils. By all accounts, Chouchani had the appearance of a vagabond and yet was reputed to be a master of vast areas of human knowledge, including science, mathematics, philosophy and especially the Talmud. Most of the biographical details of Chouchani's life are known from the works and interviews of his various students, as well as anecdotes of people whom he encountered during his lifetime.
Chouchani appeared in Paris after the Second World War, where he taught between the years of 1947 and 1952. He disappeared for a while after that, evidently spent some time in the newly formed state of Israel, returned to Paris briefly, and then left for South America where he lived until his death. He is buried at the Israeli Cemetery of La Paz, in Uruguay.

A French journalist named Salomon Malka wrote a 1994 book about him, entitled Monsieur Chouchani: L'énigme d'un maître du XXe siècle (Mister Shushani: The enigma of a 20th century master).

Chouchani and Levinas
Emmanuel Levinas's first encounter with Chouchani and their subsequent relationship is summarized as follows:

In 1945 Levinas's closest friend, Dr. Henri Nerson, a Jewish obstetrician, told him about an outstanding and quite bizarre individual he came to know during the years of the War in the area of Vichy. The man was so unusual that even his real name was not known. He used to be called Chouchani but this was more of a nickname than his true one. His external appearance was quite unpleasant; some say even repugnant. However, according to Nerson his knowledge was phenomenal. Nerson, who was known for his sober way to apprehend people and situations, was clearly in a state of excitement as if he would have become an adept of some sect. He strongly recommended to Levinas to meet Chouchani, but for two years Levinas refused. After all (...) Levinas was quite suspicious as to what this "clochard" looking man could contribute to him. Finally in 1947 Levinas agreed to meet Chouchani. We know very little about the meeting itself. But there exists a myth. The myth suggests that they met for an entire night, and in the morning Levinas said to Nerson as he was about to leave: "I can not tell what he knows; all I can say is that all that I know, he knows". Be the accuracy of this myth as it may, one fact remains indisputable. From then on, Levinas became interested in the study of Talmud to a point where most of his free time, he would devote to studying it.

For the next five years Levinas studied at length with Chouchani. Alone, with Nerson and in a weekly study group that would study Talmud and which included in addition to them a small group of friends. In 1952 Chouchani left France for Israel, and came back in 1956 for about six months before leaving Europe definitely for South America where he remained until his death in 1968.

The influence of Chouchani on Levinas is most strongly felt in Levinas' famous series of Talmudic Readings. Levinas did not acknowledge his influence until late in his life. Levinas was powerfully impressed by Chouchani's total mastery of the texts, commentaries and meta-commentaries, as well as Chouchani's ability to "widen" the scope of the Talmud, using creative, dialectic methodology. One hallmark of the "Chouchani Style" in Levinas' work is the method by which the interpretation of a text is understood not just by the words of a particular citation, but rather the entire context of that citation. Levinas' hermeneutical expositions on the Talmud, which he credits to his "master," manage to be simultaneously traditional and radical in feeling. As a result of his studies with Chouchani, Levinas saw the ancient text of Talmud and its multiple layers of subsequent commentary not merely as a place where "all that can ever be thought has been thought of already,"  but also as a framework for his reconciliation of ethics, phenomenology and postmodernity.

Chouchani and Wiesel
Elie Wiesel described his initial 1947 encounter with Chouchani in "Legends of Our Times" (Chapter 10). Wiesel writes that Chouchani was "dirty," "hairy," and "ugly;" a "vagabond" who accosted and berated him in Paris in 1947, and then became his mentor. Wiesel wrote of him again in his memoir "All Rivers Run to the Sea" (pp. 121–130). Wiesel credits Chouchani as being one of his most influential teachers.

Film 
 The Lost Ones: Monsieur Chouchani - Genie voller Rätsel. Film by Mathilde Hirsch. France, 2020

See also
 Phenomenology

References

7. Hanoch Ben Pazi, "A Philosopher in the Eye of the Storm: Monsieur Chouchani and Lévinas’s “Nameless” Essay", AJS Review 41:2 (November 2017), 315 - 331

External links
 A new website only dedicated to Monsieur Chouchani www.chouchani.com
Talmudic thinker / The loneliness of the ethical philosopher,  at Ha'aretz
 Le maître et son disciple : Chouchani et Lévinas (The Master and his disciple: Chouchani and Lévinas) by Shmuel Wygoda
 Finding Chouchani

1895 births
1968 deaths
Talmudists
20th-century French rabbis
Year of birth unknown
Lithuanian emigrants to Uruguay
Uruguayan rabbis
Unidentified people
Burials at Cementerio Israelita, La Paz